Grasslands Regional Division No. 6 or Grasslands Public Schools is a public school authority within the Canadian province of Alberta operated out of Brooks.

See also 
List of school authorities in Alberta

References

External links 

 
Brooks, Alberta
School districts in Alberta